Chet or CHET may refer to:


Places
 River Chet, a small river in South Norfolk, England
 Cheț, a village in Marghita city, Bihor County, Romania
 Cheț, a tributary of the Barcău in Bihor County, Romania

Music
 Chet (Chet Atkins album) (1967)
 Chet (Chet Baker album) (1959)

Media
 CHET-FM, a radio station in Chetwynd, British Columbia, Canada

Persons
 Chet (given name), a masculine given name and a list of people so named
 Ilan Chet (born 1939), Israeli microbiologist, professor, and President of the Weizmann Institute of Science
 Chet Faker, stage name of Australian electronica musician Nicholas James Murphy

Other uses
 Chet (month), the first month of the Sikh Nanakshahi calendar
 Heth or  Chet, the eighth letter of the Proto-Canaanite alphabet